Bolma is a genus of medium to large sea snails with a calcareous operculum, marine gastropod molluscs in the family Turbinidae, the turban snails.

Fossil records
The genus is known from the Eocene to the Recent periods (age range: from 33.9 to 0.0 million years ago). Fossils shells have been found in France, Greece, Japan, Morocco, Spain, Vanuatu, Guam, Cyprus, Greece, South Africa, Spain, Austria, Italy, Slovakia, New Zealand, Australia and Tonga. There are about 5 extinct species.

Description
The central teeth  of the radula have no cusps. They have a narrow long basal plate, which is produced above the body of the tooth. The latter is wide, oval, and not reflected above. Its lower margin is not well-defined in my specimens which are, however, not stained. The laterals are of the usual form and bear cusps.

The imperforate shell has a turbinate shape. The spire is conic with whorls rounded at the periphery.  The upper whorls are spiny. The base of the shell is convex. The operculum is nearly round with an excentric nucleus. The outside of the shell is polished, concave in the middle, with a convexity or rib upon the center of the spiral.

Distribution
This marine genus has a wide distribution. It occurs in the Red Sea, the Eastern Indian Ocean, the West Pacific, the South China Sea, the East China Sea, and off South Africa, Indo-China, the Philippines, Japan, Indonesia, New Caledonia, New Zealand and Australia (New South Wales, Northern Territory, Queensland).

Species
According to the World Register of Marine Species (WoRMS), the following species are included within the genus Bolma :

 Bolma anacanthos Beu & Ponder, 1979
 Bolma andersoni (E.A. Smith, 1902)
 Bolma aureola (Hedley, 1907)
 Bolma austroconica Beu & Ponder, 1979
 Bolma bartschii Dall, 1913
 Bolma bathyraphis (E. A. Smith, 1899)
 Bolma boucheti Alf & Kreipl, 2011
 Bolma castelinae Alf, Maestrati & Bouchet, 2010
 Bolma crassigranosa Tenison Woods, 1877
 Bolma exotica (Okutani, 1969)
 Bolma flava Beu & Ponder, 1979
 Bolma flindersi Tenison Woods, 1877
 Bolma fuscolineata Alf & Kreipl, 2009
 Bolma girgyllus (Reeve, 1861)
 Bolma granosa Borson, 1821
 Bolma guttata (A. Adams, 1863)
 Bolma henica (Watson, 1885)
 Bolma jacquelineae (Marche-Marchad, 1957)
 Bolma johnstoni (Odhner, 1923)
 Bolma kermadecensis Beau & Ponder, 1979
 Bolma kiharai Kosuge, 1986
 Bolma kreipli Alf, Maestrati & Bouchet, 2010
 Bolma maestratii Alf & Kreipl, 2009
 Bolma mainbaza Alf, Maestrati & Bouchet, 2010
 Bolma marshalli Thomson, 1908
 Bolma martinae Kreipl & Alf, 2005
 Bolma massieri Bozzetti, 1992
 Bolma meynardi Michelotti, 1847
 Bolma microconcha Kosuge, 1985
 Bolma midwayensis (Habe & Kosuge, 1970)
 Bolma millegranosa Kuroda & Habe in Habe, 1958
 Bolma minuta Neubert, 1998
 Bolma minutiradiosa Kosuge, 1983
 Bolma modesta (Reeve, 1843)
 Bolma myrica Okutani, 2001
 Bolma opaoana Bouchet & Métivier, 1983
 Bolma persica (Dall, 1907)
 Bolma pseudobathyraphis Alf, Maestrati & Bouchet, 2010
 Bolma recens Dell, 1967 
 Bolma rugosa (Linnaeus, 1767)
 Bolma sabinae Alf & Kreipl, 2004
 Bolma somaliensis Beu & Ponder, 1979
 Bolma tamikoana (Shikama, 1973)
 Bolma tantalea Alf, Maestrati & Bouchet, 2010
 Bolma tayloriana (E.A. Smith, 1880)
 Bolma venusta (Okutani, 1969)

 Species brought into synonymy 
 Bolma christianeae Nolf, 2005 : synonym of Bolma jacquelineae (Marche-Marchad, 1957)
 Bolma clemenceae Bozzetti, 2010: synonym of Bolma recens (Dell, 1967)
 Bolma erectospina Kosuge, 1983: synonym of Bolma persica (Dall, 1907)
 Bolma formosana (Shikama, 1977): synonym of Bolma millegranosa (Kuroda & Habe in Habe, 1958)
 Bolma macandrewii (Mørch, 1868): synonym of Anadema macandrewii (Mörch, 1868)
 Bolma sunderlandi Petuch, 1987: synonym of Cantrainea sunderlandi (Petuch, 1987)

The following species are also included in the Indo-Pacific Molluscan Database 
 'Bolma (Galeoastraea) asteriola (DALL, 1925)

References

 Risso, 1826,  Histoire naturelle des principales productions de l'Europe méridionale, 4: 117
 Sacco, 1896, I Molluschi dei terreni terziarii del Piemonte e della Liguria, Parte 21: 19
 Schepman, 1908,  Siboga Expeditie, 49a: 27
 Finlay, 1926, Transactions and Proceedings of the New Zealand Institute, 57: 367, 373
 Beu A. G. & Ponder W. F. (1979). A revision of the species of Bolma Risso, 1826 (Gastropoda: Turbinidae). Records of the Australian Museum 32 (1): 1-68
 Williams, S.T. (2007). Origins and diversification of Indo-West Pacific marine fauna: evolutionary history and biogeography of turban shells (Gastropoda, Turbinidae). Biological Journal of the Linnean Society, 2007, 92, 573–592
Alf A. & Kreipl K. (2011) The family Turbinidae. Subfamilies Turbininae Rafinesque, 1815 and Prisogasterinae Hickman & McLean, 1990''. In: G.T. Poppe & K. Groh (eds), A Conchological Iconography. Hackenheim: Conchbooks. pp. 1–82, pls 104-245.

External links 

  Biodiversity occurrence data provided by: (Accessed through GBIF Data Portal, www.gbif.net, 2009-10-13)
  Beu A.G. & Ponder W.F. (1979) A revision of the species of Bolma Risso, 1826 (Gastropoda: Turbinidae). Records of the Australian Museum 32(1): 1-68.

 
Turbinidae
Gastropod genera
Extant Eocene first appearances